Osaka Express (built in 2007) is a container ship operated by the shipping company Hapag-Lloyd. It can achieve a speed of 25 kn. It belongs to the Colombo Express class of ships.

References

External links
 

Container ships
2006 ships